Buddenhagen was a municipality of the Vorpommern-Greifswald district, in Mecklenburg-Vorpommern, Germany. Since 1 January 2012, it is part of the town Wolgast.

Buddenhagener Moore 

Buddenhagener Moore is a nature reserve that takes up the majority of the municipality. it is a 110-hectare piece of land that hosts various species, notably bird species like the Middle Woodpecker, the pied flycatcher, and the crossbill.

Buddenhagen Train Station 

Notably, there is also a train station in the municipality called Buddenhagen (RB23) which travels from Züssow to Świnoujście Centrum.

References

(Naturschutzgebiet Buddenhagener Moor – Wikipedia, 2021)
(Liniennetzplan für Bahn und S-Bahn, 2021)

Former municipalities in Mecklenburg-Western Pomerania